Saint-Philibert is a municipality in the Municipalité régionale de comté de Beauce-Sartigan in Quebec, Canada. It is part of the Chaudière-Appalaches region. The population is 379 as of 2021. It is named after reverend François-Philibert Lamontagne, who promoted the parish at the time of the church construction in 1919.

A fire destroyed this same church on February 14, 2009.

References

Commission de toponymie du Québec
Ministère des Affaires municipales, des Régions et de l'Occupation du territoire

Municipalities in Quebec
Incorporated places in Chaudière-Appalaches